Angel Stoyanov may refer to:

 Angel Stoyanov (boxer) (born 1967), Bulgarian boxer
 Angel Stoyanov (ski jumper) (born 1958), Bulgarian ski jumper
 Angel Stoyanov (footballer) (born 1986), Bulgarian footballer